SS Derwent was a passenger and cargo ship built for the Goole Steam Shipping Company in 1888.

History
The ship was built by William Dobson and Company in Walker Yard for the Goole Steam Shipping Company and launched on 12 June 1888.  The engines were manufactured by the Wallsend Slipway and Engineering Company, and she was constructed under the supervision of Mr Sisson, the inspecting engineer for the Goole Company.

On 19 September 1898 she was hit by her sister ship Dresden which was inward bound to Goole.

In 1905 she was acquired by the Lancashire and Yorkshire Railway.

In October 1908 she was in collision with the British brigantine Enterprise of Folkestone, and caused her to sink. All hands on the Enterprise bar one were lost.

On 28 August 1912 she was anchored midstream in Goole waiting to enter the lock, when a strong southerly wind caused her to sheer into her sister ship  which was outbound with a full cargo of coal. Derwent’s anchor chain became caught in Ralph Creyke’s propeller and her engines were stopped. The accident required Ralph Creyke to be drydocked to remove the chain.

In 1922, Derwent was acquired by the London and North Western Railway and one year later by the London, Midland and Scottish Railway. She was scrapped in 1931 by T Young in Sunderland.

References

1888 ships
Steamships of the United Kingdom
Ships built on the River Tyne
Ships of the Lancashire and Yorkshire Railway
Ships of the London and North Western Railway
Ships of the London, Midland and Scottish Railway
Maritime incidents in 1898
Maritime incidents in 1908
Maritime incidents in 1912